"A Taste of Honey" is a pop standard written by Bobby Scott and Ric Marlow. It was originally an instrumental track (or recurring theme) written for the 1960 Broadway version of the 1958 British play A Taste of Honey (which was also made into the film of the same name in 1961). Both the original and a later recording by Herb Alpert in 1965 earned the song four Grammy Awards. A vocal version of the song—first recorded by Billy Dee Williams (and released in 1961 on the Prestige label), and then recorded very successfully by Lenny Welch in the summer of 1962—was also recorded by the Beatles for their first album in 1963. Barbra Streisand performed the song as part of her cabaret act during 1962, and recorded it in January 1963 for her debut album The Barbra Streisand Album, on Columbia, which won a Grammy for Album of the Year (1963).  The publishing rights are owned 100% by Songfest Music Corporation, a subsidiary of GPS Music Corporation.

Instrumental versions
The original recorded versions of the song "A Taste of Honey", "A Taste of Honey (refrain)" and "A Taste of Honey (closing theme)", appeared on Bobby Scott's 1960 album, also titled A Taste of Honey, on Atlantic 1355. The composition won Best Instrumental Theme at the Grammy Awards of 1963.

Martin Denny, Eddie Cano and the Victor Feldman Quartet each scored minor hits in 1962 with their covers.
Acker Bilk released a version in the UK in January 1963, reaching number 16 in the UK Singles Chart.
Paul Desmond recorded a version in 1964 on his album Glad to Be Unhappy (RCA  LPM 3407)
Herb Alpert and the Tijuana Brass recorded the most popular instrumental version of the song with a cover on their 1965 album, Whipped Cream & Other Delights. This recording won four awards including Record of the Year at the Grammy Awards of 1966.  The instrumental spent five weeks at number one on the easy listening chart, reached number seven on the Billboard Hot 100.
The Ventures recorded a version in 1966 on their album Where the Action Is.
Harry James recorded a live version in 1966 on his album Live At The Riverboat (Dot DLP 3728 and DLP 25728)
Jackie Gleason, 1967, on his album A Taste Of Brass For Lovers Only (Capitol Records SW 2684)
Duke Pearson, 1967, on the album Introducing Duke Pearson's Big Band
Chet Atkins recorded a version in 1967 on his album It's a Guitar World (RCA  LSP 3728)
James Booker recorded a live version of the song, which was posthumously released in 1993 on the album Spiders On The Keys.
Emily Remler on the album Firefly

Vocal versions

The Beatles

The Beatles performed Lenny Welch's adaptation as part of their repertoire in 1962, slightly changing the lyrics in the chorus. Because the instrumental version by Acker Bilk was popular in the United Kingdom at the time, the song was chosen to be recorded for their 1963 debut album, Please Please Me. A version from that time was released in 1977 on the album Live! at the Star-Club in Hamburg, Germany; 1962.

In the US, this song first appeared on the Vee-Jay Records album  Introducing... The Beatles. They also performed "A Taste of Honey" seven times for BBC radio shows, including Here We Go, Side by Side, and Easy Beat. In 1967, McCartney was inspired to compose “Your Mother Should Know” based on a line taken from the screenplay.

Personnel
 Paul McCartney – lead vocals, bass
 John Lennon – acoustic guitar, backing vocals
 George Harrison – lead guitar, backing vocals
 Ringo Starr – brushed drums

Engineered by Norman Smith

The Supremes & Four Tops

Personnel
The Supremes
Jean Terrell - lead vocals
Mary Wilson - vocals
Cindy Birdsong - vocals
The Four Tops 
Levi Stubbs - lead vocals
Abdul "Duke" Fakir - vocals
Lawrence Payton - vocals
Renaldo "Obie" Benson - vocals

Charts

The Supremes & Four Tops version

Other artists
 Julie London released the song on her album The Wonderful World of Julie London in 1963.
 In 1964 jazz singer Morgana King released a version which became her signature song.
 The Hollies included the song at their third US album Beat Group! (1966)
 Sarah Vaughan included the song on her 1963 album Sarah Sings Soulfully
 Tony Bennett reached #94 in the US with a vocal version for his album The Many Moods of Tony in 1964.  His version of "A Taste of Honey" was recorded on September 11, 1963, with Tony Bennett on the vocals, accompanied by the Ralph Sharon Trio, and arranged by Dick Hyman.
 Israeli singer Esther Ofarim included a version on her 1965 album Is It Really Me!
 The Shins covered the song in 2017 for the cover album of Resistance Radio: The Man in the High Castle album
 Chris Connor covered the song on her 1965 album Chris Connor Sings Gentle Bossa Nova
 Tom Jones covered the song on his 1966 album From the Heart
 Don Ho's backing band, The Aliis, perform a live jazz/mambo-influenced version of the song on the 1965 album The Don Ho Show!

Television and film
The song is used for the theme of the UK comedy series Hardware.
The song is used in the 2000 Australian film The Dish, a partially fictionalised account of the role that the Parkes Observatory played in relaying the live television feed of man's first steps on the moon, during the Apollo 11 mission in 1969.
 Herb Alpert's version is the opening and closing tune of the Italian Rai Radio 1's sport broadcast Tutto il calcio, minuto per minuto (All soccer, minute by minute).
 Herb Alpert's version is used during the prank war sequence in the episode "The Europa Project" of the Netflix series Space Force.

See also
 List of number-one adult contemporary singles of 1965 (U.S.)
 List of songs covered by the Beatles

References

The Billboard Book of Top 40 Hits, 6th Edition, 1996

1960 songs
1965 singles
Songs written by Bobby Scott (musician)
Herb Alpert songs
Cashbox number-one singles
The Beatles songs
Tony Bennett songs
Grammy Award for Record of the Year
Grammy Award for Best Engineered Album, Non-Classical
Pop standards
A&M Records singles